John Sutton may refer to:

Noblemen
John Sutton II (1310–1359), first Baron Sutton of Dudley
John Sutton III (1339–1370), 2nd Baron Sutton of Dudley
John Sutton IV (1361–1396), 3rd Baron Sutton of Dudley
John Sutton V (1380–1406), father of 1st Baron Dudley
John Sutton of Lincoln (died c. 1391), MP for Lincoln
John Sutton, 1st Baron Dudley (1400–1487), Lord Lieutenant of Ireland
John Sutton, 3rd Baron Dudley (1494–1553), mockingly known as Lord Quondam
John de Sutton (fl. 1306), MP for Essex

Sportsmen
John Sutton (baseball) (born 1952), former Major League Baseball pitcher
John Sutton (footballer) (born 1983), English footballer
John Sutton (rugby league) (born 1984), Australian professional rugby league footballer
John Sutton (hurler), retired Irish sportsperson

Others
John Sutton (composer), English Renaissance composer
John Sutton (Royal Navy officer) (c. 1758-1825)
John Sutton (seed merchant) (1777–1863), founder of Suttons Seeds
John Sutton Nettlefold (1792–1866), British industrialist
Sir John Sutton, 3rd Baronet  (1820–1873), benefactor and patron in Kiedrich
John Edward Sutton (1862–1945), British trade unionist and Labour Party politician
John Sutton (actor) (1908–1963), British-Indian actor
John Sutton (geologist) (1919–1992), British geologist after which the Sutton Heights are named
John Sutton (RAF officer) (1932–2014)
John Sutton (economist) (born 1948), economist at the London School of Economics
John R. Sutton (born 1949), sociologist at University of California, Santa Barbara
John F. Sutton Jr. (1919–2013), American lawyer and academic
Oliver Humperdink (John Sutton; 1949–2011), professional wrestling manager
Johnny Sutton (born 1961), U.S. politician

See also
John Manners-Sutton (disambiguation)